Grinder was a gunboat serving as a tender, rather than a commissioned warship, to  HMS Anholt, the British garrison on the island of Anholt during the Gunboat War. Grinders origins are obscure, but the Danes captured her in 1810 and the British recaptured her in 1811. She was sold in 1832.

Prelude - capture of Anholt
Together they captured the island. A landing party of seamen and marines under the command of Captain William Selby of Owen Glendower, with the assistance of Captain Edward Nicolls of the Standards marines, landed. The Danish garrison of 170 men put up a sharp but ineffectual resistance that killed one British marine and wounded two; the garrison then surrendered. The British took immediate possession of the island.

Tender to HMS Anholt
In 1810 Captain Nicolls, now Governor of Anholt, was concerned about reports of a Danish force gathering in Jutland to retake Anholt. He therefore ordered boats off Anholt to maintain a watch over Randers Fjord and Grenå whenever the wind was fair. To this end he re-launched "GB Grinder", which had overwintered on the island. Nicolls gave Grinder a crew made up of 30 seamen and marines from the island's garrison and captained by Master's Mate Thomas Hester. Nicolls also assigned Grinder the mission of intercepting trade along the shore.

Grinder captured a Danish trading sloop "on the Swedish coast" on 17 March. On the following day Nicolls sent her "to look into the harbour of Harrup", where she discovered a number of small Danish trading vessels and proceeded to capture five of them "...in sight of the enemies flotilla of gunboats". Reportedly, these six were among 12 merchantmen that Grinder had captured.

Capture by the Danes, (1810)
On 13 April 1810 Grinder was pursuing two small ships when Senior Lieutenant Peter Nicolay Skibsted, who with four Danish gunboats was convoying eight transport ships from Udbyhøj (at the mouth of the Randers Fjord, Jutland) to Samsø, spotted her. He immediately concealed his gunboats behind the transports, thus tricking Grinder into drawing closer. As soon as Hester noticed the stratagem, he tried to escape, but Skibsted was successful in the next 90 minutes in rowing up to him, and after a few shots were exchanged, forcing Hester to surrender. The muster rolls for HMS Anholt record Hester and 27 men  as "discharged - prisoner in Denmark" on 17 April 1810. One man was recorded as having died.

The Times reported that "A Gottenburg mail has brought letters and papers to the 3rd inst. An article, under the date April 21, gives a long account of  the capture of an English gun brig in the Baltic. This vessel had wintered at Anholt. Her loss was two men killed and two wounded. She proved to be the Grinder, Lieutenant Esher."Morning Chronicle (London), 14 May 1810.

Danish service (21 April 1810 to 5 July 1811)
The Danes brought Grinder into Samsø where they repaired her battle damage. They renamed her Prise No.5, and Midshipman Oldelan then commissioned her on 21 April 1810; in Danish service she was armed with:
One 24-pounder cannon 
One 24-pounder carronade and 
One 4-pounder howitzer.

On 23 June 1810 Prise No.5 sailed to Fladstrand (modern name Frederikshavn). There she joined the flotilla under Senior Lieutenant Falsen,  which already included two large and two smaller gunboats, plus the captured . Prise No.5 then moved to Skagen, (Northern Jutland) where on 4 and 5 August, a storm forced her aground. She was refloated and in December she sailed to Fladstrand, where she was laid up. From March 1811 Prise No.5 was based at Fladstrand.

Recapture (1811)
The Danes record that on 5 July 1811 the British recaptured Prise No.5 between the islands of Hjelmen and Sejerø when the Fladstrand flotilla attacked a British convoy. As they passed Hjelm Island a flotilla of 17 Dano-Norwegian gunboats and 10 rowboats came out to attack the convoy. The attackers lost four gunboats; the convoy had no losses. During the action, Sheldrake captured the Danish gunboats No. 2 and No. 5.

Fate
While laid up at Sheerness, Grinder was offered for sale by the Admiralty on 24 July 1832, and sold on 22 August the same year.

Notes, citations, and references
Notes

Citations

References
 Degenkolv, H. (1906) Oplysninger vedrørende den danske flaades skibe i sidste aarhundrede. (Information concerning The Danish fleet's ships in the last century). (København).
 Garde, Hans Den dansk-norske Sömagts historie 1700-1814.  (The History of Danish-Norwegian Naval Power). 
 With, J.P. Danske og norske søheltes Bedrifter fra Aar 1797 - 1813. (The exploits of Danish and Norwegian sea-heroes in the years 1797 - 1813). page 119
 Topsøe-Jensen, T.A., og Emil Marquard (1935) Officerer i Den dansk-norske søetat 1660-1814 og Den danske søetat 1814-1932. (Andet bind Kloppenborg-Ørsted. H. Hagerup). (Officers of the Danish-Norwegian Naval service). Vol 2. Page 519
 Wandell, C.F. (1815) Søkrigen i de dansk-norske farvande 1807-14 (The War at sea in Danish-Norwegian Waters 1807-14), (Copenhagen: Carlsbergsfonden for Jacob Lund).
 With I P (1819) Danske og Norske Søheltes Bedrifter 1797 - 1813 (Tales of Danish Naval Heroes from 1797 - 1813)

Gunboats of the Royal Navy
Ships of the Royal Dano-Norwegian Navy
1809 ships
Captured ships